A Personal Shopping System (PSS) is a system designed to help customers with their purchases in a supermarket or any kind of self-service retailer. In this system, when the customer arrives at a supermarket, instead of picking a shopping cart, he/she picks an equipment (PDA or similar) which provides a friendly shopping interface.

Using some known technologies (barcode or RFID), the equipment is capable of showing on the screen all sort of information about any product available on the shelves. If customers prefer, they do not have to drive a shopping cart, which means they won't have the effort to load and push. The same way people buy in the Internet will do in the store, with the only difference that they'll take their purchase to home immediately instead of waiting for delivery.

References

Retail point of sale systems